Krzysztof Pawlikowski (born 1946) is a Polish-born New Zealand computer science academic.

After a PhD at the University of Gdańsk in Poland, he moved to New Zealand, starting at University of Canterbury in September 1984. His research focuses on discrete event simulation methods and tools, particularly for modelling of computer network performance.

He is active in a number of international collaborations including PlanetLab.

References

External links
 Google scholar 
 LinkedIn
 Institutional homepage

University of Gdańsk alumni
Academic staff of the University of Canterbury
New Zealand computer scientists
Polish computer scientists
Polish emigrants to New Zealand
1946 births
Living people